The 2015 Munster Senior Football Championship will be that year's installment of the annual Munster Senior Football Championship held under the auspices of Munster GAA. It is one of the four provincial competitions of the 2015 All-Ireland Senior Football Championship. Kerry entered the competition as defending Munster champions and retained their title after a 1-11 to 1-6 victory over Cork in a replay.		

The draw to decide the fixtures was made on 10 October 2014. Having reached the final the year before, Cork and Kerry were both given places in the semi-finals of the competition, but unlike previous seasons, they were not prevented from meeting each other in the semi-finals. Despite this, the two teams were drawn on different sides of the tournament, and so could not meet outside the final.

Under GAA rules introduced in 2014 to allow counties to more easily predict the dates of their qualifier matches, the two sides of the draw will be named as either A or B. Which sides will be A and B has yet to be decided.

Teams
The Munster championship is contested by all six counties in the Irish province of Munster.

Bracket

Quarter-final refs	
	
Semi-final refs

See also
 2015 All-Ireland Senior Football Championship
 2015 Connacht Senior Football Championship
 2015 Leinster Senior Football Championship
 2015 Ulster Senior Football Championship

References

External links
 Munster GAA website

2M
Munster Senior Football Championship